Ayr Burghs was a district of burghs constituency of the House of Commons of the Parliament of Great Britain from 1708 to 1800 and of the House of Commons of the Parliament of the United Kingdom from 1801 to 1950. It elected one Member of Parliament (MP), using the first-past-the-post voting system.

Creation
The British parliamentary constituency was created in 1708 following the Acts of Union 1707 and replaced the former Parliament of Scotland burgh constituencies of Ayr, Campbeltown, Inveraray, Irvine and Rothesay.

Boundaries

The list of parliamentary burghs represented by the constituency changed in 1832 and again in 1918:

 1708 to 1832: the Ayrshire burghs of Ayr and Irvine, the Argyllshire burghs of Campbeltown and Inveraray and the Buteshire burgh of Rothesay

 1832 to 1918: the Ayrshire burghs of Ayr and Irvine and the Argyllshire burghs of Campbeltown, Inveraray and Oban
 1918 to 1950: the Ayrshire burghs of Ardrossan, Ayr, Irvine, Prestwick, Saltcoats and Troon
When the Ayr Burghs constituency was abolished in 1950, the Ayr and Prestwick burghs were merged into the county constituency of Ayr. Ardrossan and Saltcoats were merged into Bute and Northern Ayrshire and Irvine and Troon were merged into Central Ayrshire.

Members of Parliament

Sir Thomas was elected, in 1950, as the first MP for the then new constituency of Ayr

Elections

Elections in the 1830s

Kennedy was appointed as a Lord Commissioner of the Treasury, requiring a by-election.

Kennedy resigned, causing a by-election.

Elections in the 1840s

Elections in the 1850s

Back to Elections

Elections in the 1860s 

Back to Elections

Elections in the 1870s

Back to Elections

Elections in the 1880s 

Campbell's death caused a by-election.

Back to Elections

Elections in the 1890s 

Back to Elections

Elections in the 1900s 

Back to Elections

Elections in the 1910s 

Back to Elections

Elections in the 1920s 

Back to Elections

Elections in the 1930s 

Back to Elections

Elections in the 1940s 

Back to Top

See also 
 List of former Parliamentary constituencies in the United Kingdom

References 

Historic parliamentary constituencies in Scotland (Westminster)
Constituencies of the Parliament of the United Kingdom established in 1708
Constituencies of the Parliament of the United Kingdom disestablished in 1950
1708 establishments in Scotland
1950 disestablishments in Scotland
Ayr
Irvine, North Ayrshire
Politics of Ayrshire